Ryan Steelberg is a seasoned technology executive and pioneer of digital and data-driven businesses. He is currently the Co-Founder, President, and CEO of Veritone, Inc., a leading AI software and services company, public on NASDAQ (VERI). He also serves on its board of directors.

Previously, he served as the President of Veritone, from 2015 to 2022. Prior to Veritone, Mr. Steelberg served as Chief Executive Officer of Brand Affinity Technologies, Inc. Prior to that, he served as the Head of Broadcast at Google Inc. From 2002 to 2007, he was the Co-Founder and President of dMarc Broadcasting, an advertising technology company that was acquired by Google Inc. in 2006. From 1998 to 2000, he served as President and CEO of 2CAN Media, a company that was acquired by CMGi. From 1995 to 1998 he served as President of AdForce, a company that was also acquired by CMGi in September of 1999, after its IPO earlier that year.

Early life
Ryan Scott Steelberg was born in Northridge, California. He attended Corona del Mar High School in Newport Beach, California. He later attended the University of California, Los Angeles, where he majored in biology.

Business career

AdForce (CMGi)
Steelberg launched his career by co-founding AdForce with his brother Chad Steelberg in 1995. AdForce (formerly ADFC on NASDAQ), became the world's largest centralized independent ad serving and management solution. It was acquired by CMGI after going public for more than $500 million in 1999. In 2000, AdForce won the Smithsonian Award for the Best Technology in IT.

2CAN Media (CMGi)
In 1998, the Steelbergs founded 2CAN Media, an internet advertising sales organization, which grew to become the 3rd largest internet advertising sales organization of its kind. It was also later sold to CMGI for over $50 million in a merger with Adsmart/Engage Media.

dMarc Broadcasting (Google)
In 2002, the Steelbergs co-founded DMarc Broadcasting, the largest centralized radio advertising network and digital automation company servicing more than 4,600 Radio Broadcasters. DMarc was acquired by Google in February 2006 for $102 million in cash, with revenue targets that pushed the deal upwards of $1.2B. As of January 2009, total payouts have exceeded $400 million in cash.

Brand Affinity Technologies
In 2007, Ryan co-founded along with his brother Chad, Brand Affinity Technologies, a technology and marketing services company.

Veritone
In 2014, Ryan and his brother Chad co-founded artificial intelligence company Veritone. Veritone is traded on the NASDAQ public exchange under the symbol VERI.

Accolades
The Steelbergs have been named by the Orange County Business Journal as one of the county's "50 Most Influential Businesspeople." They were also finalists for Ernst & Young's "Entrepreneur of the Year" in 2000. In 2006, Chad and Ryan Steelberg were named one of the "50 Most Powerful People in Radio" by Radio Ink Magazine.

In 2009, Steelberg was named by Sports Business Journal as one of their annual "Forty Under 40" award winners. This award honors the top 40 best and brightest young executives in the sports industry under the age of 40.

In 2011, the Steelbergs were honored with the Excellence in Entrepreneurship Awards by the Orange County Business Journal.

Fortune Magazine has also recognized Steelberg as an innovator in the advertising and digital space.

References

Other sources
Kafka, Peter, "A New Scheme to Get Web Surfers to Stay Put: Photos", All Things Digital, Wall Street Journal, August 3, 2010.

Ives, Nat, "Making News Sites Stickier With Apps that Summon the Web", Advertising Age, August 3, 2010.

Olson, Mike. "Player's Choice", Wired Magazine, June 1, 2010.

Elliot, Stuart, "A Place Where Sponsors Sign Athletes", New York Times, October 18, 2009.

Helft, Miguel. "Google Encounters Hurdles in Selling Radio Advertising", New York Times, February 10, 2007.

"What the Google/dMarc "Marriage" Means for Radio", Radio Ink Magazine, February 27, 2006.

Chuang, T. "O.C. venture gets Googled", Orange County Business Journal, June 17, 2002.

1973 births
Living people